From Victoria to Vladivostok: Canada's Siberian Expedition, 1917-19 is a 2010 book written by Ben Isitt. It was published by University British Columbia Press, and translated into a French-language edition by Presses de l'Université Laval and a Russian-language edition by the Korpus Company in Vladivostok.

Reception
Mark Osborne Humphries praised the book, and wrote in Left History that "Isitt is at his best here".

References

Bibliography
 
 
 

2010 non-fiction books
Canadian non-fiction books